Boogie Man is a 2018 British English-language romantic comedy film directed by Andy Morahan and starring Kush Khanna, Amy Jackson, Aston Merrygold and Jerry-Jane Pears. 

Shot in London and India, the film premiered at the Cannes Film Festival in spring 2018 and went on to screen at multiple others, garnering awards from the UK Asian Film Festival and Calcutta International Cult Films Festival.

Synopsis 
Feeling adrift, British-Indian teenager Pavan is unsure how to come to terms with his present and future life. His grandfather and mother want him to become the first person in their family to attend and graduate from college, however Pavan is unsure if this is really what he wants. His friends seem far more self assured, making Pavan feel somewhat isolated. His love for 70s disco music gives him solace, particularly as it allows him to feel closer to his dead father, who also loved disco. As a way of escaping familial and cultural pressure, Pavan occasionally imagines himself as the hero in an idealized 70s landscape set to a disco soundtrack. 

When he has the chance to attend a disco themed party Pavan jumps at the chance, where he has a brief meeting with Stephanie, a 20-something model and actress. Pavan falls instantly in love with her, despite spending little time together, and becomes determined to win her heart.

Cast 
Kush Khanna as Pavan
Amy Jackson as Nimisha 
Aston Merrygold as Danny
Jerry-Jane Pears as Stephanie Crane
Roshan Seth as Pavan's grandfather
Shobu Kapoor as Pavan's mother
Karan Gill as Rama
Simone Ashley as Aarti
Nicholas Prasad as Sunil
Ramon Tikaram as Deepak

Production 
The film began production in February of 2017. The film was shot in London and India. The film was launched at the Cannes Film Festival.

Reception 
Reviewing the film at the UK Asian Film Festival, a critic from Desiblitz wrote that "Boogie Man is a fun mix of Seventies music and Bollywood emotion" and added that the film was a "feel-good comedy". A critic from the CKF International Film Festival wrote that the film was "A good watch in today’s challenging quarantine time to uplift your spirit".

Accolades

References

Notes

External links